Sick Animals is a 1970 Romanian film directed by Nicolae Breban. It was entered into the 1971 Cannes Film Festival.

Cast
 Mircea Albulescu
 Ion Dichiseanu
 Emilia Dobrin
 Dan Nutu

References

External links

1970 films
Romanian crime films
1970s Romanian-language films
Films directed by Nicolae Breban